The 1964 Swedish speedway season was the 1964 season of motorcycle speedway in Sweden.

Individual

Individual Championship
The 1964 Swedish Individual Speedway Championship final was held on 25 September in Stockholm. Ove Fundin won the Swedish Championship for the fifth time.

Junior Championship
 
Winner - Karl Erik Andersson

Team

Team Championship
Getingarna won division 1 and were declared the winners of the Swedish Speedway Team Championship for the third time and second consecutive year. The Getingarna team contained Göte Nordin, Leif Larsson and Bengt Jansson.

Vargarna won the second division, Taxarna and Kaparna B won the third division A & B respectively.

Smålands Lejon were renamed Lejonen and Folkare became Masarna.

See also 
 Speedway in Sweden

References

Speedway leagues
Professional sports leagues in Sweden
Swedish
Seasons in Swedish speedway